Kuman may refer to:
Kuman, Albania, a village in the Roskovec municipality, Fier County, Albania
Küman, a municipality in Azerbaijan
Cumans, an ancient people
Kuman language (disambiguation), several unrelated languages

See also 
Kuman Thong, a Thai household divinity